Trevor S. Harris is an American economist currently the Arthur J. Samberg Professor at Columbia Business School and formerly the Jerome A. Chazen Professor of International Business. His interests have included accounting.

Education
BComm (Hons.), University of Cape Town, 1976; MComm, 1980; PhD, University of Washington, 1983.

Bibliography

References

Year of birth missing (living people)
Living people
Columbia Business School faculty
American economists
University of Cape Town alumni
University of Washington alumni